Destiney Moore is a reality television personality known for her appearances on Rock of Love 2, I Love Money and Rock of Love: Charm School. She is also an occasional exotic dancer and posed nude for the September 2011 issue of Hustler.

Reality television

Rock of Love 2
Moore was the second runner-up on the second season of Rock of Love with Bret Michaels. On the show, she had rivalries with contestants Kristy Jo Muller (and, to a lesser extent, Daisy De La Hoya). She, her father, and Bret rode motorcycles together before her father died from cancer.

I Love Money
Shortly after Rock of Love, Destiney appeared on I Love Money. Over the course of the show, she developed short-lived flings with two of the other cast members, Heat and The Entertainer. She was eliminated on the fifth episode after clashing with the major alliances on the show and her own assertions that she "just doesn't play dirty".

Rock of Love: Charm School
Destiney was the runner up on Rock of Love: Charm School. She was the winner of the Smet challenge, which involved designing a t-shirt for Christian Audigier's new clothing line. As a result, Audigier agreed to sell Destiney's design as a t-shirt in stores nationwide. At the final elimination, she was offered an internship with Daniella. On the reunion show, Destiney announced that instead of taking Daniella's internship, she teamed up with her fiancé, who is a design artist, and is launching of her new brand called Divination.

Other television Appearances
She appeared on Spike's MANswers. She was also on the GSN's Baggage; she chose David and he accepted her baggage.

Filmography
Moore appeared in an Escape The Fate video for their song "Situations". She also appeared as a waitress in the movie Georgia Rule in 2007.

Destiney has also appeared in the horror movie Reality Horror Night, released on Halloween 2009. Moore played herself as she appeared on VH1 reality shows.

References

External links
 
 Destiney Sue Moore on Myspace

Living people
Participants in American reality television series
1978 births
People from Libby, Montana